The 1991–92 season was Manchester City's third consecutive season in the top tier of English football, the Football League First Division.

Season summary
The 1991–92 season saw another solid campaign for Peter Reid's Manchester City side as they finished 5th in the top flight for a second season running.

Kit
City's kit was manufactured by English company Umbro and sponsored by Japanese electronics manufacturer Brother.

Final league table

Results summary

Results
Manchester City's score comes first

Legend

Football League First Division

FA Cup

League Cup

Full Members' Cup

Squad

Transfers

In

Out

Transfers in:  £4,400,000
Transfers out:  £2,430,000
Total spending:  £1,970,000

References

Manchester City F.C. seasons
Manchester City